Cinnamon tea is a herbal tea made by infusing cinnamon bark in water.

Regional variations

Chile 
In Chile,  ("tea with cinnamon") is made by placing a cinnamon stick into the teapot when steeping black tea.

Korea 

Gyepi-cha ("cinnamon tea") is a traditional Korean tea made from cassia cinnamon barks. Thicker sticks of cinnamon with purplish-red cross-section and strong fragrance are used. Dried cinnamon sticks are simmered either whole or sliced with a small amount of ginger. When served, the tea is strained and optionally sweetened with sugar or honey, and then is usually garnished with minced jujubes.

Lebanon 
In Lebanon, shaayi bil qirfah wa’l yansoon’ ("anise and cinnamon tea") is made by boiling aniseed and cinnamon (powdered or sticks) in water. Optionally, black tea may be added. The tea is strained and served with or without added sugar.

See also 

 Ginger tea
 Sujeonggwa – Korean cinnamon punch

References 

Herbal tea
Korean tea
Traditional Korean medicine

.